In mathematics, the field trace is a particular function defined with respect to a finite field extension L/K, which is a K-linear map from L onto K.

Definition
Let K be a field and L a finite extension (and hence an algebraic extension) of K. L can be viewed as a vector space over K. Multiplication by α, an element of L,
,
is a K-linear transformation of this vector space into itself. The trace, TrL/K(α), is defined as the trace (in the linear algebra sense) of this linear transformation.

For α in L, let σ(α), ..., σ(α) be the roots (counted with multiplicity) of the minimal polynomial of α over K  (in some extension field of K). Then

If L/K is separable then each root appears only once (however this does not mean the coefficient above is one; for example if α is the identity element 1 of K then the trace is [L:K&hairsp;] times 1).

More particularly, if L/K is a Galois extension and α is in L, then the trace of α is the sum of all the Galois conjugates of α, i.e.,

where Gal(L/K) denotes the Galois group of L/K.

Example
,
and so, .

Properties of the trace
Several properties of the trace function hold for any finite extension.

The trace  is a K-linear map (a K-linear functional), that is
.

If  then 

Additionally, trace behaves well in towers of fields: if M is a finite extension of L, then the trace from M to K is just the composition of the trace from M to L with the trace from L to K, i.e.
.

Finite fields
Let L = GF(qn) be a finite extension of a finite field K = GF(q). Since L/K is a Galois extension, if α is in L, then the trace of α is the sum of all the Galois conjugates of α, i.e.

In this setting we have the additional properties:
 .

Theorem. For b ∈ L, let Fb be the map  Then  if . Moreover, the K-linear transformations from L to K are exactly the maps of the form Fb as b varies over the field L.

When K is the prime subfield of L, the trace is called the absolute trace and otherwise it is a relative trace.

Application
A quadratic equation,  with a ≠ 0, and coefficients in the finite field  has either 0, 1 or 2 roots in GF(q) (and two roots, counted with multiplicity, in the quadratic extension GF(q2)). If the characteristic of GF(q) is odd, the discriminant  indicates the number of roots in GF(q) and the classical quadratic formula gives the roots. However, when GF(q) has even characteristic (i.e.,  for some positive integer h), these formulas are no longer applicable.

Consider the quadratic equation  with coefficients in the finite field GF(2h). If b = 0 then this equation has the unique solution  in GF(q). If  then the substitution  converts the quadratic equation to the form:

This equation has two solutions in GF(q) if and only if the absolute trace  In this case, if y = s is one of the solutions, then y = s + 1 is the other. Let k be any element of GF(q) with  Then a solution to the equation is given by:

When h = 2m + 1, a solution is given by the simpler expression:

Trace form
If L/K is a Galois extension, the trace form is invariant with respect to the Galois group.

The trace form is used in algebraic number theory in the theory of the different ideal.

The trace form for a finite degree field extension L/K has non-negative signature for any field ordering of K.  The converse, that every Witt equivalence class with non-negative signature contains a trace form, is true for algebraic number fields K.

If L/K'' is an inseparable extension, then the trace form is identically 0.

See also
 Field norm
 Reduced trace

Notes

References

Further reading
 
 Section VI.5 of 

Field (mathematics)